Thanthania Kalibari is a Kali temple on Bidhan Sarani
in Kolkata, West Bengal, India. The deity in the temple is known as Siddheshwari. On the occasion of Kali Puja, devotees gather at the temple for worship.

History

The Thanthania Kalibari was founded by Shankar Ghosh (whose grandson was Swami Subhodhananda, a direct disciple of 19th century mystic Ramakrishna) in 1803, as mentioned in the temple building itself. However, according to a different tradition it was built in 1703. The image of the presiding deity Siddheshwari is made of clay and the idol is painted every year with the colors red and black. Tuesdays and Saturdays are considered auspicious for a visit to the temple. The temple is 300+ years old and the idol is even older.

Worship of deity
The Temple opens for seven days in a week. Daily it opens its door at 6:00 a.m. and remains open till 11:00 a.m. It reopens its door for the devotees at 3:00 p.m. and closes for the day at 8:00 p.m. Since the temple is a Tantrik temple, animal sacrifice is still continued on all no moon nights and during Kali Puja.

See also
 List of Hindu temples in West Bengal

References 

Hindu temples in Kolkata